The Popular Force Party or People's Force Party was a Mexican political party created in 1945 as the electoral arm of the National Synarchist Union. It participated in the 1946 presidential election, in which it supported the independent Jesús A. Castro.

The party was banned when on December 19, 1948, members of the party decided to put a black hood on the monument of former president Benito Juárez in Mexico City. It continued to enter electoral politics until the 1970s.

Electoral history

Presidential elections

References

Political parties established in 1946
Far-right politics in Mexico
Defunct political parties in Mexico
Banned far-right parties
Fascist parties
National syndicalism